David Nalbandian defeated Rafael Nadal in the final, 6–4, 6–0 to win the singles tennis title at the 2007 Paris Masters.

Nikolay Davydenko was the defending champion, but lost in the third round to Marcos Baghdatis.

Seeds
All seeds received a bye into the second round. 

  Roger Federer (third round)
  Rafael Nadal (final)
  Novak Djokovic (second round)
  Nikolay Davydenko (third round)
  David Ferrer (quarterfinals)
  James Blake (third round)
  Fernando González (second round)
  Tommy Robredo (quarterfinals)
  Tommy Haas (third round)
  Richard Gasquet (semifinals)
  Guillermo Cañas (third round)
  Tomáš Berdych (third round)
  Ivan Ljubičić (second round)
  Carlos Moyá (second round)
  Andy Murray (quarterfinals)
  Juan Ignacio Chela (second round)

Draw

Finals

Top half

Section 1

Section 2

Bottom half

Section 3

Section 4

Qualifying

Qualifying seeds

Qualifiers

Qualifying draw

First qualifier

Second qualifier

Third qualifier

Fourth qualifier

Fifth qualifier

Sixth qualifier

References

External links
Draw
Qualifying draw

Singles